St. Laurence Catholic Church, formerly St. Laurence Cathedral, is a parish church in the Diocese of Amarillo located in Amarillo, Texas, United States. It served as the cathedral church of the Diocese of Amarillo from 1975 to 2011.

History
On June 12, 1949, public Masses on Sundays and holy days began at St. Lucien’s Chapel at Price College in Northeast Amarillo. More than 40 people attended the first Mass. These Masses led to the establishment of St. Laurence Parish in 1955. St. Laurence School began before the parish, however. Ground was broken for a three-room school building on April 18, 1954. School opened in September that year with 71 students in two grades. The parish itself was started on May 16, 1955.  The Rev. Leroy Matthiesen was named the first pastor. The parish continued to gather at St. Lucien’s until the present church was built. After a capital campaign surpassed its $100,000 goal ground was broken for a building that was meant to be a temporary church in early 1959. Bishop John L. Morkovsky dedicated the new church on December 2, 1959. The parish continued to grow throughout the 1960s, but it was affected by the closing of Amarillo Air Force Base in 1968. The parish lost 600 families and enrollment at the school declined as costs rose. It was able to remain viable by the families and retired military personnel who remained.

By the early 1970s Sacred Heart Cathedral in downtown Amarillo declined to 25 families and it was determined to close the parish. St. Laurence Church, which had seating for 500, was the largest church in town. It was also located on diocesan property that included the Chancery Office, the bishop’s residence, Alamo Catholic High School, and St. Francis Convent.  On November 10, 1974, Bishop Lawrence M. DeFalco executed the decree from the Holy See naming St. Laurence Church as the diocese’s new cathedral.  It was decided not to build a new cathedral, but to remodel the existing structure. Fort Worth architect Paul Deeley and Santa Fe, New Mexico liturgical artist Andrea Bacigalupa created a new worship space in the old church. The old pews were given to Our Lady of Guadalupe Church in Matador and St. Margaret Mary in Lamesa. The renovated church was consecrated as St. Laurence Cathedral on October 5, 1975. Paul Deeley won a first-place honor in 1977 at the Design Awards Program of the American Institute of Architects in Fort Worth for his work at St. Laurence. On March 25, 2011 St. Mary’s Church in Amarillo, which had dedicated a new church on September 11, 2010, was named by Pope Benedict XVI as the third cathedral for the Amarillo Diocese. St. Laurence reverted to the status of a parish church.

See also
List of Catholic cathedrals in the United States
List of cathedrals in the United States

References

Christian organizations established in 1955
Roman Catholic churches completed in 1959
Former cathedrals in the United States
Roman Catholic cathedrals in Texas
Buildings and structures in Amarillo, Texas
Modernist architecture in Texas
1955 establishments in Texas
20th-century Roman Catholic church buildings in the United States